Proprioseiopsis latoscutatus is a species of mite in the family Phytoseiidae.

References

latoscutatus
Articles created by Qbugbot
Animals described in 1976